The Episcopal Diocese of Western Louisiana is the diocese of the Episcopal Church in the United States of America whose territory comprises the western part of the state of Louisiana, including Shreveport.

Organization
Organized through division of the Episcopal Diocese of Louisiana in 1979, it had (as of 2006) 48 parishes, 11,603 active baptized members, and an average Sunday attendance of 4,015. The diocese and its parishes sponsor nine parochial schools and preschools. The diocese is part of Province VII.

There have been four bishops of Western Louisiana:

 Willis R. Henton (1980–1990)
 Robert Jefferson Hargrove, Jr. (1990–2001)
 D. Bruce MacPherson (2002–2012)
 Jacob Wayne Owensby (July 2012–present)

The diocesan cathedral is St. Mark's, Shreveport; the diocesan offices are in the former parish hall of Mt. Olivet Chapel in Pineville.

References

External links
Episcopal Diocese of Western Louisiana website

Western Louisiana
Diocese of Western Louisiana
Christian organizations established in 1979
Province 7 of the Episcopal Church (United States)
1979 establishments in Louisiana